The Gart der Gesundheit (Early German for Latin hortus sanitatis) was edited in 1485. It was written by Johann Wonnecke von Kaub and it is one of the first printed herbals in German. It was often reprinted until the 18th century. The Gart der Gesundheit is an important late medieval work concerning the knowledge of natural history, especially that of medicinal plants. In 435 chapters 382 plants, 25 drugs from the animal kingdom and 28 minerals are described and illustrated. The book was edited by Peter Schöffer in Mainz. Together with the Latin Herbarius moguntinus (Peter Schöffer 1484) and the Latin Hortus sanitatis (Jacob Meydenbach in Mainz 1491), the Gart der Gesundheit belongs to the "group of Mainz herbal incunabula".

Text 
The text is a collection of earlier texts in German and in Latin on drugs from the herbal, animal, and mineral kingdoms. The reader cannot rely on the names the author gives to his citations. Sometimes he gives no name, for example for the citations he took from the Physica of Hildegard of Bingen. More often he even gives incorrect names to his citations.

Illustrations
About 100 of the 379 illustrations in the Gart der Gesundheit are of high standard quality. Erhard Reuwich is supposed to be the creator of these woodcuts, who depict the character of plants in clear lines. Opposing to some modern authors, who called these illustrations "primitive" in a bad sense, Arnold C. Klebs stated in 1925:
"We who today in our aesthetic demands are drawing away more and more from the slavish copying of nature and demand that a work of art expresses type and character, can better appreciate the didactic value of these simple drawings than the previous generation to whom the photographic appealed as the highest form of truthful representation."

Editions 
 Mainz (Peter Schöffer) March,  28. 1485 (Digitalisat)
 Augsburg (Hans Schönsperger?) August, 22. 1485 (Digitalisat)
 Strasbourg 1485
 Basel 1486
 Augsburg (Hans Schönsberger) June, 5. 1486 (Digitalisat)
 Augsburg (Hans Schönsberger) March, 7. 1487 
 Ulm (Conrad Dinckmut) March, 31. 1487 (Digitalisat)
 Straßburg 1487 (Digitalisat)
 Straßburg 1488 (Digitalisat)
 Augsburg (Hans Schönsberger) December, 15. 1488 (Digitalisat)
 Lübeck (Arends) 1492
 Augsburg (Hans Schönsberger) August, 13. 1493 (Digitalisat)
 Augsburg (Hans Schönsberger) May, 10. 1496 (Digitalisat)
 Augsburg (Hans Schönsberger) May, 13. 1499 
 Straßburg (Johann Prüß) 1507 (Digitalisat)
 Straßburg (R. Beck) 1515 (Digitalisat)

Notes 

Herbals
Incunabula

External links